Rhyssemus germanus is a species of aphodiine dung beetle in the family Scarabaeidae. It is found in Europe and Northern Asia (excluding China) and North America.

References

Further reading

External links

 

Scarabaeidae
Articles created by Qbugbot
Beetles described in 1767
Taxa named by Carl Linnaeus